Henndorf am Wallersee, commonly named Henndorf, is a municipality of 5,025 inhabitants in the district of Salzburg-Umgebung in the state of Salzburg in Austria.

History
The town was first mentioned in 6th century.

Geography
Henndorf is located around 16 kilometres to the north-east of Salzburg, by the Wallersee lake. The municipality borders with Eugendorf, Neumarkt am Wallersee, Seekirchen am Wallersee, Köstendorf and Thalgau. It is divided into 9 Katastralgemeinden: the town of Henndorf and 8 villages:

Personalities
Carl Zuckmayer (1896–1977), German writer, lived for some years in Henndorf
Richard Mayr (1877-1935) renowned Austrian Bass-Baritone was very closely associated with Henndorf.

See also
Salzkammergut
Salzkammergut-Lokalbahn
Salzburg S-Bahn

References

External links

 Municipal site of Henndorf
 Henndorf on "Salzburg Wiki"

Cities and towns in Salzburg-Umgebung District